Salisbury is a city in and the county seat of Wicomico County, Maryland, United States.Salisbury is the largest city in the state's Eastern Shore region, with a population was 33,050 at the 2020 census. Salisbury is the principal city of the Salisbury, Maryland-Delaware Metropolitan Statistical Area. The city is the commercial hub of the Delmarva Peninsula, which was long devoted to agriculture and had a southern culture. It calls itself "The Comfortable Side of Coastal".

History

Salisbury's location at the head of Wicomico River was a major factor in growth. At first, it was a small colonial outpost set up by Lord Baltimore.

Salisbury's location at the head of the Wicomico River was seen to be a convenient location for trading purposes. Due to the similar physical attributes as well as the nationality of Salisbury's founders, many historians believe that the name was inspired by the city of Salisbury, England, an ancient cathedral city.

Salisbury also had a role in the Civil War, as it served as a location where Union forces encamped in order to search for sympathizers from the South. These Union forces also worked to inhibit the movement of contraband to Confederate forces in the South.

Disaster struck Salisbury in both 1860 and 1886, as fires burned through two-thirds of the Town. Although met with adversity, the resolve of the people of Salisbury was unshaken as the county in which Salisbury was located continued to grow, and Salisbury was considered to be the heart, or major town, of the county.

In 1867, when the Wicomico County was formed out of parts of both Somerset and Worcester Counties, Salisbury became the government seat.

Today, Salisbury attracts a wide variety of different businesses in addition to the county, state, and federal government offices.

Adding to the diversity of Salisbury, the City is host to a wide variety of events celebrating local culture and the arts. These events include 3rd Friday, an event held in downtown Salisbury on the third Friday of each month, celebrating local music, artists, and nonprofit organizations.

Salisbury is also home to a historical City Park, the Salisbury Zoo, The Centre at Salisbury shopping mall, and the Wicomico Youth & Civic Center.

The Gillis-Grier House, Honeysuckle Lodge, Sen. William P. Jackson House, Pemberton Hall, Perry-Cooper House, Poplar Hill Mansion, Union Station, and F. Leonard Wailes Law Office are listed on the National Register of Historic Places.

Geography

Salisbury is located at  (38.365806, −75.593361).

Climate
Salisbury's location on the Atlantic Coastal Plain in Maryland gives it a humid subtropical climate (Köppen climate classification Cfa), with hot, humid summers and, on average, cool to mild winters.

Demographics

Salisbury is the principal city of the Salisbury, Maryland-Delaware Metropolitan Statistical Area, which consists of Somerset, Wicomico, and Worcester counties in Maryland and Sussex County in Delaware.

2000 census
As of the census of 2000, there were 23,743 people, 9,061 households, and 4,802 families residing in the city. The racial makeup of the city was 60.71% White, 32.32% African American, 0.23% Native American, 3.19% Asian, 0.03% Pacific Islander, 1.47% from other races, and 2.06% from two or more races. Hispanic or Latino of any race were 3.39% of the population.

There were 9,061 households, out of which 27.4% had children under the age of 18 living with them, 30.4% were married couples living together, 18.2% had a female householder with no husband present, and 47.0% were non-families. 33.5% of all households were made up of individuals, and 12.2% had someone living alone who was 65 years of age or older. The average household size was 2.36 and the average family size was 3.00. In 2005, 324 new single family homes were built, with an average value of $119,358.

In the city, the age distribution of the population shows 21.8% under the age of 18, 21.8% from 18 to 24, 26.9% from 25 to 44, 17.0% from 45 to 64, and 12.5% who were 65 years of age or older. The median age was 29 years. For every 100 females, there were 87.2 males. For every 100 females age 18 and over, there were 82.9 males.

The median income for a household in the city was $29,191, and the median income for a family was $35,527. Males had a median income of $26,829 versus $21,920 for females. The per capita income for the city was $15,228. About 16.5% of families and 23.8% of the population were below the poverty line, including 28.9% of those under age 18 and 10.2% of those age 65 or over.

2010 census
As of the census of 2010, there were 30,343 people, 11,983 households, and 6,040 families residing in the city. The racial makeup of the city was 55.7% White, 34.4% African American, 0.3% Native American, 3.2% Asian, 0.1% Pacific Islander, 3.1% from other races, and 3.2% from two or more races. Hispanic or Latino of any race were 7.0% of the population.

There were 11,983 households, of which 29.1% had children under the age of 18 living with them, 26.4% were married couples living together, 19.1% had a female householder with no husband present, 5.0% had a male householder with no wife present, and 49.6% were non-families. 32.5% of all households were made up of individuals, and 12% had someone living alone who was 65 years of age or older. The average household size was 2.42 and the average family size was 3.04.

The median age in the city was 28.1 years. 21.7% of residents were under the age of 18; 22.9% were between the ages of 18 and 24; 25.4% were from 25 to 44; 18.8% were from 45 to 64; and 11.1% were 65 years of age or older. The gender makeup of the city was 46.3% male and 53.7% female.

2022 census
As of the census of 2022, there were 32,850 people and 12,542 households in the city. The racial makeup of the city was 41.2% White, 42.0% African American, 0.5% Native American, 3.7% Asian, 0.1% Pacific Islander, and 7.4% from two or more races. Hispanic or Latino of any race were 9.2% of the population. 

The average household had 2.50 persons.

In the city, the age distribution of the population shows 6.9% under the age of 5, 16.0% from 5 to 17, 65.6% from 18 to 64, and 11.5% who were 65 years of age or older. The gender makeup of the city was 45.7% male and 54.3% female.

The median income for a household in the city was $41,905. The per capita income for the city was $21,990. About 24.7% of the population were below the poverty line.

Crime

Notable crimes
Garfield King was a black man lynched by a mob in Salisbury. He was hung next to the courthouse after he reportedly shot Herman Kenney, a 22-year-old white man with a revolver after arguing with him.

In December 1931, Salisbury was the site of another lynching of a black man. Matthew Williams was accused of murdering his white employer, Daniel J. (DJ) Elliot, at his office on Lake Street. The authorities found D.J. Elliot dead at his desk, his son, James Elliot present, and Matthew Williams incapacitated by several gunshot wounds. After being taken to Peninsula General Hospital, a 300-man white mob threw Williams from a second-floor window to the crowd below, where he was stabbed, tied to a truck and dragged three blocks to the county court house. There they hanged him from a tree, before he had any chance of a trial. The mob paraded Williams' body through the black part of Salisbury for intimidation, and mutilated and burned him. It was the 32nd lynching in Maryland since 1882. No one was prosecuted for Williams' killing, as was typical in lynchings. As of 2007, there was no commemoration of the extrajudicial killing.

A 2017 memorial for Matthew Williams reignited the call for commemoration of the lynchings, with the known location of Matthew Williams' lynching (Wicomico County Circuit Courthouse lawn) emerging as the focal point. On this site, however, stood a sign some saw as antithetical to the sacred nature of the site as the location of one of the last lynchings in Maryland: a marker commemorating Confederate General John H. Winder. A 2018 documentary film (The Sign) was produced, documenting and unraveling the complexities of this conflict, "exposing deep wounds from the complicated history of the Eastern Shore."

In January 2020, Mayor Jake Day announced the formation of a Lynching Memorial Task Force which was tasked with "coordinating with the Equal Justice Initiative's Community Remembrance Project to facilitate the creation of a permanent monument in honor and solemn remembrance of the three American citizens who lost their lives at the hands of lynch mobs in Wicomico County."

Statistics

Crime in 2019 was the lowest in the city's history, with the five safest years on record being 1986, 1996, 2016, 2018, and 2019. Part One crimes, which are included in the table to the right, consist of the more serious crimes, including shoplifting, burglary, assault, theft, and rape.

Government
Salisbury is a municipality within Wicomico County. The form of government is strong-mayor, as defined by the City Charter. In this form, executive functions are vested in a popularly elected mayor who serves a four-year term; currently John 'Jack' R. Heath. The Mayor is the chief executive officer and the head of the administrative branch of the city government. In that role, he is responsible for overseeing the various departments in the city, ensuring that the ordinances of the city are executed, providing an annual report on the financial condition and accomplishments of the city, appointing the heads of all departments and members of committees and commissions, prepare an annual budget, and supervise the City Administrator who manages day-to-day functions. The City Administrator is the supervisor of all department heads, except the City Clerk and City Attorney. The City Administrator may also perform all other tasks delegated by the Mayor. Legislative and oversight functions are the purview of the elected council. The five council members are elected to four-year terms from the city's five districts. City elections are non-partisan. The council meets in regular session the second and fourth Monday of each month in Council Chambers. Council work sessions are held the first and third Monday of each month. The council also holds the ability to fill vacancies in the council or appoint an acting mayor when a vacancy occurs.

Mayors of Salisbury
 there have been 28 Mayors of Salisbury, listed to the right.

During times of extended absence, a Mayor may delegate the majority of their duties to the City Administrator, such in 2020 when Mayor Jacob R. Day was deployed to Africa as an information operations officer with the 110th Information Operations Battalion of the Maryland Army National Guard. Mayor Day said "City Administrator Julia Glanz will take over executive duties for the duration of the deployment". Vacancies in the office of the Mayor are filled by a majority vote of the City Council, with an Acting Mayor.

All-America City Award
On June 18, 2010 Salisbury received the All-America City Award.

The City received the award for three projects:
 The revitalization of Rose and Lake Street neighborhoods in partnership with nonprofit organization Salisbury Neighborhood Housing, Inc, the State of Maryland, Parkside High School CTE program, Hebron Savings Bank, and a grant from the Community Foundation of the Eastern Shore.
 The Youth Leadership Academy which developed leadership in students in grades 8–11.
 Homeless initiatives including the Code Blue Shelter operated by nonprofit organization Hope And Life Outreach (HALO) with assistance for veterans from nonprofit NATRA, Inc., which provides counseling services.

Economy and businesses

According to the US Conference of Mayors, the Salisbury MD-DE Metropolitan Statistical Area had the 7th fastest rate of job growth in the nation in 2016, with a 4.2% increase in employment.

Perdue Farms, a multi-national poultry corporation, is headquartered in Salisbury. Other industries in Salisbury include healthcare, accommodation and foodservice, electronic component manufacturing, pharmaceuticals, shipbuilding, and agriculture.

Some of the major employers in Salisbury include: Salisbury University, Verizon, Peninsula Regional Medical Center, The Knowland Group and Pepsi Bottling of Delmarva. Peninsula Regional Medical Center employs more Salisbury residents than any other company, while Perdue Farms is the largest employer headquartered in Salisbury (with nearly 22,000 employees). The labor market for Wicomico County is 45,033 and for the lower shore three counties a total of 86,798 (as of May 2017).

Piedmont Airlines, a regional airline, is headquartered in unincorporated Wicomico County, on the grounds of Salisbury-Ocean City Wicomico Regional Airport near Salisbury.

Education
Public schools are under the jurisdiction of Wicomico County Public Schools. Several private institutions maintain academic programs within the city.

Post secondary:
Public: Salisbury University and Wor-Wic Community College

Secondary: 
Public: James M. Bennett High School, Parkside High School, Wicomico High School, Salisbury Middle School, Wicomico Middle School, and Bennett Middle School
Private: Faith Baptist School, Salisbury Baptist Academy, St. Frances de Sales, Salisbury Christian School, Stepping Stones Learning Academy, The Salisbury School, and Wicomico Day School

Elementary:
Public: Chipman, East Salisbury, Glen Avenue, North Salisbury, Pemberton, Pinehurst, Prince Street, West Salisbury, and Westside Intermediate
Private: Faith Baptist School, Salisbury Christian School, St. Frances de Sales, Stepping Stones Learning Academy, The Salisbury School, and Wicomico Day School

Media

Periodicals

 The Daily Times
 Salisbury Independent – weekly publication of Independent Newsmedia Inc.
 The Metropolitan Magazine – monthly magazine
 Wicomico Weekly – weekly publication of the Daily Times

Radio

 WGBZ – 88.3 FM – Christian contemporary
 W206AY – 89.1 FM – Religious
 W282AW – 104.3 FM – Classic hits
 WSCL – 89.5 FM – National Public Radio, Classical
 W204AY – 89.9 FM – Religious
 WDIH – 90.3 FM – Religious
 WESM – 91.3 FM – Jazz
 W220CT – 91.9 FM – Christian contemporary
 WNKZ-FM – 92.5 FM – Christian contemporary
 WZBH – 93.5 FM – Rock
 WKDB – 95.3 FM – Adult contemporary
 WKZP – 95.9 FM – Top 40
 WXSU – 96.3 FM – College
 WAVD – 97.1 FM – Classic hits
 WKTT – 97.5 FM –  Hip-Hop
 WUSX – 98.5 FM –  Country
 WSBY – 98.9 FM –  Urban adult contemporary
 WWFG – 99.9 FM –  Country
 WRBY-LP – 100.5 FM – multi-categorical broadcasting in Haitian Creole
 WICO-FM – 101.1 FM Classic country
 WJKI-FM – 103.5 FM – Classic rock
 WRDE-FM – 103.9 FM – Country
 WQHQ – 104.7 FM – Adult contemporary
 W286AX – 105.1 FM – Christian contemporary
 WLSW – 105.5 FM – Gospel/Christian
 WGBG-FM – 107.7 FM –  Classic rock
 WTGM – 960 AM – Sports
 WJKI – 1320 AM – Classic rock
 WJDY – 1470 AM – Fox Sports Radio

Television

 WBOC Channel 16, DT 16.1 CBS
 WBOC-DT2 (Fox 21 Delmarva) DT 21.2 Fox
 WBOC-LD (Telemundo Delmarva) Channel 42, DT 42.1/42.2 Telemundo
 WRDE-LD Channel 31, DT 31.1 NBC
 WRDE-LD2 (MyCoziTV) DT 31.2 MyNetworkTV & Cozi TV
 WMDT Channel 47, DT 47.1 ABC
 WMDT-DT2 (The CW 3 Delmarva) DT 47.2 The CW
 WMDT-DT3 (MeTV) DT 47.3 MeTV
 WGDV-LD (Azteca América) Channel 32, DT 32.1
 WCPB Channel 28, DT 58.1 & 58.2 PBS—additional subchannels 58.3–58.5
 PAC 14 Public, Educational, and Government Access Television Channel 14 (Comcast)

Culture
Museums and other historic facilities include: Salisbury University Arboretum, Salisbury Zoo, Ward Museum of Wildfowl Art, Edward H. Nabb Center for Delmarva History and Culture, Chipman Cultural Center, and Poplar Hill Mansion.

Parks, playgrounds, and community centers
The City, with input from its Parks and Recreation Committee, maintains numerous parks including Comfort Safety Zone Playground, Doverdale Park and Playground, Elizabeth W. Woodcock Park and Playground, Jeannete P. Chipman Boundless Playground (fully handicapped accessible), Lake Street Park and Playground, Newtown Park, Newtown – Camden Tot Lot Playground, Riverwalk Park, Salisbury City Park and Zoo, Waterside Park, and Naylor Mill Forest Trail. Naylor Mill Forest Trail, at over 92 acres, contains the largest conservation easement inside a municipality, in the State of Maryland. Additionally, the Port of Salisbury Marina is located near downtown Salisbury, in the Marina District. The community manages three Community Gardens, located in Waterside Park, Newton-Camden Tot Lot Playground, and Jeannete P. Chipman Boundless Playground.

Wicomico County Public Schools maintains recreational fields and courts at each of the county schools. The county also maintains other parks in the Salisbury area: Billy Gene Jackson Sr. Park, Coulbourn Mill Pond Park, Crooked Oak Playground, Indian Village Playground, Leonards Mill Park, Pemberton Historical Park, Schumaker Park, and Winterplace Park.

The City operates two community centers, the Truitt Street Community Center and the Copeland House at Newton Community Center. These centers provide recreational opportunities in addition to arts & crafts, poetry & creative writing, music, and homework assistance for youth and continuing education courses for adults through a partnership with Wor-Wic Community College.

Sports

The Eastern Shore Baseball League was headquartered in Salisbury; two franchises, the Salisbury Cardinals and the Salisbury Indians, called the city home. Today, the Delmarva Shorebirds represent the town in the Low-A East. The Eastern Shore Baseball Hall of Fame is housed at the Arthur W. Perdue Stadium. The Shorebirds are a Single-A Affiliate of the Baltimore Orioles.

Salisbury also is home to Division 3 Salisbury Seagulls. The Seagulls have been dominant in football, field hockey, baseball, Men's Rugby and lacrosse, including multiple NCAA lacrosse national titles. Seagull Stadium hosts the university's football team while Maggs Gymnasium hosts basketball.

Salisbury also has the Wicomico Stallions, a minor league football team; the Salisbury Rollergirls, an all-female, competitive, WFTDA-member, flat-track roller derby league; Doverdale Youth Lacrosse; the Salisbury Rhinos Youth Football; and many programs through the county's Recreation and Parks department.

Events
 National Folk Festival – Was hosted in Salisbury in 2018, 2019, and 2021. The fourth year of a four-year run is scheduled for August 26–28, 2022.
 SBY Marathon – A marathon, half-marathon, and 5K held in Salisbury. The marathon is a qualifier for the Boston and New York City Marathons.
Dance for Kindness – Freeze mob/flash mob held in downtown Salisbury each Sunday prior to World Kindness Day. Celebrating kindSBY and Salisbury's designation as USA's first World Kindness USA City by the World Kindness Movement.

Organizations
Community participation through various groups fosters friendliness and betterment. Organizations that sponsor events within the city include: Salisbury Area Chamber of Commerce, The Salisbury Junior Chamber of Commerce (aka Salisbury Jaycees), Junior Achievement of the Eastern Shore, Community Foundation of the Eastern Shore, Salisbury Symphony Orchestra, Salisbury Community Band, Community Players of Salisbury, and the Peace Alliance of the Lower Shore. Several churches within the community also boast impressive musical programs, notably Wicomico Presbyterian Church and Asbury United Methodist Church. Salisbury also contains a number of scout troops, chartered at organizations across the city.

Sister cities

Salisbury's sister cities are:
 Salinas, Ecuador
 Salisbury, England, United Kingdom
 Tartu, Estonia

Transportation
Salisbury is served by two major highways—U.S. Route 13, one of the major north–south routes of the Delmarva Peninsula, and U.S. Route 50, one of the major east–west routes on the peninsula. US 13 connects Salisbury to Dover, Delaware and Norfolk, Virginia and is known as the Ocean Highway, while US 50 serves as the main route between the Baltimore/Washington region and many of the major cities on Delmarva, including Ocean City; it is known as the Ocean Gateway. US 13 and US 50 originally passed through the central business district, but have been subsequently rerouted onto the Salisbury Bypass, a 3/4 beltway around the city that allows through traffic on US 13 and US 50 to bypass the downtown area; earlier routes of both highways are now U.S. Route 13 Business and U.S. Route 50 Business. Earlier still, US 13 was routed along Division Street and US 50 along Main Street.

The city is also served by Maryland Route 12, a rural highway that connects Salisbury to the town of Snow Hill, and Maryland Route 349, a rural highway that connects Salisbury to Nanticoke and Quantico.

The Delmarva Central Railroad provides freight rail service to Salisbury.

The city is served by daily scheduled American Eagle service to both Philadelphia, Pennsylvania and Charlotte, North Carolina at the Wicomico Regional Airport. Additionally, the Port of Salisbury offers respite for recreational boaters and commercial tug boats. Salisbury's navigable stop on the Wicomico River is the second largest and second busiest commercial port in Maryland.

The city is also served by Shore Transit, which provides local bus service throughout the city, and also services points outside the city within the tri-county area, such as Ocean City's public transportation system. The major transfer point is on Calvert Street, in downtown Salisbury.

Greyhound Lines provides intercity bus service to Salisbury from a bus stop at the Shore Transit Tri-County facility. From this stop, direct service is provided to various locations including the Port Authority Bus Terminal in New York City, Wilmington, Delaware, the Baltimore Greyhound Terminal in Baltimore, Norfolk, Virginia, and Richmond, Virginia. BayRunner Shuttle offers shuttle service from the Baltimore-Washington International Airport and the BWI Rail Station to Salisbury. Amtrak Thruway service is available via the BayRunner Shuttle to the BWI Rail Station.

Notable people

 Alex Azar, former secretary of the United States Department of Health and Human Services
 James Cannon Jr., bishop for the Methodist Episcopal Church
 Norman Conway, Maryland state delegate from 1987–2014
 Alexis Denisof, actor
 John Glover, actor
 Fernando Guerrero, professional boxer
 Linda Hamilton, actress
 John Woodland Hastings, expert in bioluminescence
 Bruce Howard, MLB pitcher
 William Humphreys Jackson, Congressman from 1901–1905 and 1907–1909
 William Purnell Jackson, Maryland Congressman from 1912–1914, State Treasurer 1918–1920
 Reid Klopp, professional soccer player
 Ogden Nash, author and poet
 Frank Perdue, businessman
 Jessica Lee Rose, actor
 Paul Sarbanes, Maryland's second longest-serving U.S. Senator, retired 2007
 Mike Seidel, meteorologist at The Weather Channel since 1992
 Kevin Shaffer, NFL football player
 Matthew Williams, victim of racial violence
 Darnell Savage Jr., NFL football player for the Green Bay Packers

See also
 Salisbury Municipal Incinerator

References

External links

 
 
 City of Salisbury official website

 
Populated places established in 1732
Cities in Maryland
Cities in Wicomico County, Maryland
Port cities and towns in Maryland
County seats in Maryland
Salisbury metropolitan area
1732 establishments in Maryland